Alryyan TV(Arabic; قناة الريان الفضائية) is one of the arms of Al Rayyan Media and Marketing Company of the Special Engineering Office, the manufacturing company, and through "Al Rayyan" Productions a series of films and programs for the organizing committee of the national day celebrations.

Channel vision
AlRayyan TV adopts Qatar National Vision (2030) and aspires to be a supportive media for achieving sustainable development through three main functions: "Development, Awareness and Entertainment", which the channel will translate into a program mix representing its media strategy.
Al Rayyan is a diverse channel that targets the Qatari community as a key audience and takes into account the specificity of its national identity and aspirations. It aims at promoting the development of the society and educating its groups to contribute to the realization of the Qatar National Vision (2030). It also promotes the values of virtue and positiveness, the authenticity of the Qatari heritage, the support of social communication and the promotion of the spirit of competition and creative thinking among the youth in general and all segments of society in general. Useful and within the framework of combining interest and entertainment using the best production and broadcast techniques. The channel will also keep abreast of the times by announcing a visionary creed that supports the renaissance of Qatar and contributes to sustainable development.

References

External links
 AlRyyan TV website

Television in Qatar
Arab mass media
Arabic-language television stations
International broadcasters
Qatari brands
Arab Spring and the media
Mass media in Doha
Television channels and stations established in 2011
2011 establishments in Qatar